Harold Fraser "Hal" Brown (September 14, 1920 – January 12, 1997) was a former Canadian ice hockey right winger. He played in the National Hockey League for the New York Rangers. He was born in Brandon, Manitoba. Brown served in World War II with the Royal Canadian Navy. He died at his home in Calgary, Alberta in 1997.

References

External links

1920 births
1997 deaths
Canadian ice hockey right wingers
Canadian military personnel of World War II
Sportspeople from Brandon, Manitoba
New York Rangers players
Ice hockey people from Manitoba
Canadian expatriate ice hockey players in the United States